The Phasmatidae are a family of the stick insects (order Phasmatodea). They belong to the superfamily Anareolatae of suborder Verophasmatodea.

Like many of their relatives, the Phasmatidae are capable of regenerating limbs and commonly reproduce by parthenogenesis. Despite their bizarre, even threatening appearance, they are harmless to humans.

The Phasmatidae contain some of the largest insects in existence. An undescribed species of Phryganistria is the longest living insect known, able to reach a total length of 64 cm (25.2 inch).

Subfamilies
Following the Phasmid Study Group, nine subfamilies are recognized in the Phasmatidae. Other treatments differ, sometimes recognizing as few as six.

The Lonchodinae were historically often placed in the Diapheromeridae, the other family of the  Anareolatae. The Phasmatinae are often expanded to include the two tribes here separated as the Clitumninae, while the Extatosomatinae may be similarly included in the Tropidoderinae as a tribe.

The Phasmid Species File currently lists:
 Cladomorphinae (found in: Southern America, Madagascar, Java, Sulawesi)
 Clitumninae (sometimes in Phasmatinae)
 Extatosomatinae: contains the single genus Extatosoma Gray, 1833 (found in Australasia)
 Lonchodinae (sometimes in Diapheromeridae: now includes the Eurycanthinae)
 Megacraniinae (Asia, Australasia)
 Pachymorphinae
 Phasmatinae (sometimes includes Clitumninae)
 Platycraninae (Asia, Australasia)
 Tropidoderinae (sometimes includes Extatosomatinae)
 Xeroderinae
In addition, the extinct subfamily  Echinosomiscinae is known from the genus Echinosomiscus from the Burmese amber.

In addition, a number of Phasmatidae taxa are here considered incertae sedis:
 Tribe Achriopterini (Africa, Madagascar)
 Achrioptera Coquerel, 1861
 Glawiana Hennemann & Conle, 2004
 Tribe not placed
 Monoiognosis Cliquennois & Brock, 2004 (Mauritius)
 Spathomorpha Cliquennois, 2005 (Madagascar)

Consequently, numerous taxa are transferred or re-transferred to other genera, which results in 22 new or revised combinations or status of genera and species.

See also
 James Wood-Mason
 List of Phasmatidae genera

References

Further reading

  Balderson, J., Rentz, D.C.F. and Roach, A.M.E. (1998). in Houston, W.K.K. & Wells, A. (1998) (eds) Zoological Catalogue of Australia. Vol. 23. Melbourne: CSIRO Publishing, Australia. pp. 347–376.
 Bradley, J.C., and Galil, B.S. (1977). The taxonomic arrangement of the Phasmatodea with keys to the subfamilies and tribes. Proceedings of the Entomological Society of Washington, 79(2): 176–208.
 Gurney, A.B. (1947). Notes on some remarkable Australasian walkingsticks, including a synopsis of the Genus Extatosoma (Orthoptera: Phasmatidae). Annals of the Entomological Society of America. 40(3): 373–396.
 Key, K.H.L. (1970). Phasmatodea (Stick-insects). pp. 394–404 in CSIRO (ed.) The Insects of Australia. Melbourne: Melbourne University Press, Vol. 1.
 Kirby, W.F. (1904). A Synonymic Catalogue of Orthoptera. 8vo. Vol. 1. Orthoptera, Euplexoptera, Cursoria, et Gressoria (Forficulidæ, Hemimeridæ, Blattidæ, Mantidæ, Phasmidæ). London: Longmans & Co. x 501 pp.
 Latreille, P.A. (1817). Volume 3: Les Crustacés, Les Arachnides et Les Insectes, Cuvier, G.L.C.F.D. (1817). Le Régne Animal. Paris.
 Rentz, D.C.F (1996). Grasshopper Country, Chapter 16, Phasmatodea: Leaf and Stick Insects, pp. 244–257.

External links

 AnimalDiversity: Phasmatidae
 CSIRO: Phasmatidae
 Guide to Stick Insects

 
Phasmatodea families